Edensor is a civil parish in the Derbyshire Dales district of Derbyshire, England. The parish contains 50 listed buildings that are recorded on the National Heritage List for England. Of these, one is listed at Grade I, the highest of the three grades, six are at Grade II*, the middle grade, and the others are at Grade II, the lowest grade.  The parish contains the model village of Edensor, which was created by Joseph Paxton for the 6th Duke of Devonshire,  and the surrounding area.  Most of the listed buildings are houses, cottages and associated structures, mainly within the village.  The other listed buildings include a church, a cross and a tomb in the churchyard, a guidestone, a bridge, a former cotton mill, a hotel and a stable block converted for other uses, an ornamental fountain, a water trough, the wall and railings enclosing the village, and a telephone kiosk.


Key

Buildings

References

Citations

Sources

 

Lists of listed buildings in Derbyshire